Sedir Island, also known as Cleopatra Island, is a small island in the Gulf of Gökova of southeastern Aegean Sea off the coast of Ula, part of Muğla Province of Turkey. It is famous for its beach made from seashells. It is said that this organic sand was brought by ships from the Red Sea especially for Cleopatra. Each grain of sand is a perfect sphere, for this reason the beach is heavily protected by the government to prevent any sand being removed from the beach. According to legend, Anthony and Cleopatra swam here and the sands were brought by ships from North Africa. It has been said that this type of sand can only be found in Egypt.

See also
 List of islands of Turkey

References

External links
 Images of Sedir Island
 Sedir Island-Cleopatra Beach

Islands of Turkey
Islands of Muğla Province